Li Yansong (born ) is a visually impaired sprinter from China. He competed at the 2004, 2008 and 2012 Paralympics and won seven medals, including two gold medals in the  relay.

Li is married and has one daughter. He has a degree in sport studies from Beijing Sports Institute. He began losing his eyesight around the age of 18.

References

Paralympic athletes of China
Athletes (track and field) at the 2004 Summer Paralympics
Athletes (track and field) at the 2008 Summer Paralympics
Athletes (track and field) at the 2012 Summer Paralympics
Paralympic gold medalists for China
Paralympic silver medalists for China
Paralympic bronze medalists for China
Chinese male sprinters
1982 births
Living people
Medalists at the 2004 Summer Paralympics
Medalists at the 2008 Summer Paralympics
Medalists at the 2012 Summer Paralympics
Paralympic medalists in athletics (track and field)
21st-century Chinese people
Medalists at the 2010 Asian Para Games